The Israeli Basketball All-Star Game is an annual basketball event in Israel. The event was first played in the 1990s and it returned in the 2010-11 season after a lengthy hiatus. The All-Star Game includes a match between a selection of the best players of the Israeli League, a slam-dunk and a three-point contest. The rosters for the All-Star Game are chosen by an online voting, with fans choosing one international player and one local player from each team. It is organized by the Israeli Basketball Premier League.

List of games
Bold: Team that won the game.

Three-Point Shoot Contest

Slam-Dunk Contest

Players with most appearances (2011-present)

2001 All-Star Game rosters

Group A: Tal Burstein, Ariel McDonald, Nate Huffman, Nadav Henefeld, Derrick Sharp, Anthony Parker (all Maccabi Tel Aviv players), Yariv Yatzkan, Andre Spencer (both Ironi Ramat Gan players), Amir Muchtary (from Haifa B.C), Itzik Ochanon (from Bney Herzelia).
Group B: Lamont Jones, Yoav Saffar, Rimas Kaukenas (all Hapoel Galil Elyon players), Papi Turgeman, Kebo Stewart, Tony Dorsey (all Hapoel Jerusalem players), Guy Kantor, Yaniv Green (both Maccabi Raaanana players), Afik Nissim (from Maccabi Rishon LeZion), Tomer Steinhour (from Maccabi Givat Shmuel).

References

Basketball all-star games
Basketball in Israel